John T. "Toyzilla" Marshall is an author, pop culture expert, comic book writer and film producer.

He has written five reference books on vintage toys:  (GI Joe And Other Backyard Heroes (1997), Action figures of the 1980s (1998), Action Figures of the 1960s (1998), Comic Book Hero Toys (1999), and Collecting Monster Toys (1999), all published by Schiffer Publishing).

He has also been a columnist for Toy Shop, Collectors' Showcase, and Collecting Toys.

Additionally he has been a contributor to several notable books on vintage toys, such as The Collectible GI Joe by Derryl DePriest.

In 1993 he formed a comic book publishing company, Marshall Comics, and in the mid-1990s wrote for independent comic book publisher Antarctic Press, including seven issues of Ninja High School.

In 2007 he wrote and produced an independent film, Slammerella, co-starring Tiffany Pao.

References
 The Wall Street Journal (Sept 25 1998 pg W10), The Courier-Post (October 10, 1998), The MetroWest Daily News (Sept 27, 2001), AntiqueWeek (Nov 27, 2000), Toy Shop (Aug 9 2002 and others), Collecting Toys (February 1997 and others), Collectors' Showcase (July/August 1999 and others).

External links
 Official site

Living people
Toy collecting
Year of birth missing (living people)